Tanker Brewery is an Estonian craft brewery founded in Tallinn in 2014. The brewery's best-selling product is Sauna Session, a beer flavoured with birch whisks.

In 2019, Tanker Brewery opened a new factory in the town of Jüri south of Tallinn, nearly two times bigger than their existing factory. This allowed the brewery to package beer in cans instead of glass bottles.

In 2021, Tanker Brewery was acquired by the Danish company Royal Unibrew, which also owns the Finnish brewery Hartwall. Tanker's CEO, Jaanis Tammela, said the cooperation would be beneficial to both parties and would enable further growth, expansion into new markets and wider product availability.

In 2022 the Estonian Agriculture and Food Board initiated proceedings against Tanker's owner for submitting false information about the origin of some Tanker beers. It had become apparent that they were produced not in Estonia but by Royal Unibrew's Lithuanian subsidiary Kalnapilis.

References

External links
 

Breweries in Estonia
Food and drink companies established in 2014
Royal Unibrew subsidiaries